The 2022 IIHF Women's World Championship Final was played on 4 September 2022, at KVIK Hockey Arena in Herning, Denmark. Canada defeated the United States 2–1 in to win their 12th title.

Background
Since the first IIHF Women's World Championship in 1990 and the first women's tournament at the Winter Olympics in 1998, the American and Canadian national teams have played in the finals on all occasions except for the 2006 Winter Olympics, when Sweden played Canada, and the 2019 IIHF Women's World Championship, when Finland played the United States.

Road to the final

Match

References

External links
Official website

Final
IIHF
IIHF